Seyyed Hoseyn (also Romanized as Seyyed Ḩoseyn; also known as Deh-e Seyyed Ḩoseyn) is a village in Shapur Rural District, in the Central District of Kazerun County, Fars Province, Iran. At the 2006 census, its population was 1,446, in 283 families.

References 

Populated places in Kazerun County